Hawaii has the eighteenth highest per capita income in the United States of America, at $21,525 (2000).  Its personal per capita income is $46,034 (2014). The information is represented in the table below.

Hawaii counties ranked by per capita income 

Note: Data is from the 2010 United States Census Data and the 2006-2010 American Community Survey 5-Year Estimates.

Hawaii places ranked by per capita income

References

Per capita income
Income
Hawaii